Harwell Hamilton and Jean Bangs Harris House and Office is a historic home and office located at Raleigh, Wake County, North Carolina.  It was designed by architect Harwell Hamilton Harris (1903-1990) and is a two-story, Modern Movement style dwelling.  The stucco-clad modular building was constructed in 1968–1970, with an addition completing the original design made in 1977.  It originally housed Harris's architectural practice on the second floor and the couple's home and a rental apartment on the ground floor.  It served Harris and his wife during their final working years as their office and retirement home.

It was listed on the National Register of Historic Places in 2010.

References 

Houses on the National Register of Historic Places in North Carolina
Modernist architecture in North Carolina
Houses completed in 1970
Houses in Raleigh, North Carolina
National Register of Historic Places in Raleigh, North Carolina